I Am... is a female-led drama anthology series of standalone stories created by Dominic Savage for Channel 4. Each episode is developed and written by Dominic Savage in collaboration with the leading actress.

Background
Created, written and directed by filmmaker Dominic Savage, each episode of I Am... centres on a titular character which the episode is named after. Each standalone story was developed in a creative partnership with the leading actor, with improvised dialogue and themes including relationships, mental health, and empowerment.

Filming for the first series took place in 29 days, effectively 10 days per episode. According to I Am...s producer Krishnendu Majumdar, the filmmakers wanted an intimate but cinematic look for the episodes. Majumdar said the whole series was shot hand-held "as though we are eavesdropping on the characters", in order to add to the documentary feel of the drama.

Episodes

Series 1

Series 2

Series 3

References

External links
 

2019 British television series debuts
2010s British anthology television series
2010s British drama television series
2020s British anthology television series
2020s British drama television series
English-language television shows
Channel 4 original programming